Giovanni Giavazzi (14 April 1920 – 30 June 2019) was an Italian politician who served as an MEP.

References

1920 births
2019 deaths
Italian politicians